From late 2001, following the United States-led Invasion of Afghanistan, and during subsequent the War in Afghanistan, the Norwegian Armed Forces maintained a steady presence of troops, (peaking at approximately 90) in the country, attached to the larger International Security Assistance Force (ISAF).

As of October 2013, there had been 10 Norwegian Armed Forces fatalities in the War, seven of these due to Improvised explosive devices, two due to direct hostile gunfire, and one in connection with the 2011 Mazar-i-Sharif attack. In addition there were at least 26 non-fatal combat-related casualties.

List of fatalities 
The following is a list of the fatal casualties:

References 

Lists of Norwegian military personnel
Military of Norway
Norwegian military personnel killed in the War in Afghanistan (2001–2021)
Military history of Afghanistan
Afghanistan–Norway military relations
Norwegian